The first election to Swansea County Borough Council took place in 1889. It was followed by the 1890 election. The previous Town Council which had 24 members (18 councillors and 6 aldermen) would now have 40 members (30 councillors and 10 aldermen). An additional 16 members would therefore be elected.

Almost all candidates expressed no party affiliation, fighting the contest on local issues.

Ward Results

Alexandra (two seats)

Brynmelin (one seat)

Castle (two seats)

East (one seat)

Ffynone (two seats)

Landore (two seats)

Morriston (two seats)

St Helen's (two seats)

St John's (three seats)

Victoria (one seat)

Election of Aldermen
Seven aldermen were elected at the annual meeting of the Council held on 9 November. An attempt was made to ensure that aldermen from particular wards were elected but this was ruled out of order. The following aldermen were elected for a term of six years.

Mason 27 
Martin 26 
Monger 23 
Chapman 23 
Richards 23 
Pike 19 
Rocke 18

References

Council elections in Swansea
Swansea County Borough
19th century in Swansea